Beam's Eight Star is a blended whiskey produced in Clermont, Kentucky and Frankfort, Kentucky by Beam Suntory.

Beam's Eight Star is an 80-proof (40% alcohol by volume) mixture of 75% grain neutral spirits and 25% straight whiskey. It is inexpensive due to its high proportion of neutral spirits. Neutral grain spirits do not have to be aged like straight whiskey and can be mass-produced at a much faster rate.

The manufacturer is identified on the label as "The Clear Spring Distilling Company".

References

External links
 Jim Beam official website

Whiskies of the United States
Alcoholic drink brands
Bullitt County, Kentucky
Beam Suntory
Kentucky cuisine